Zhang Huaixi (born February 1935) was a Chinese male politician, who served as the vice chairperson of the Chinese People's Political Consultative Conference.

References 

1935 births
Living people
Vice Chairpersons of the National Committee of the Chinese People's Political Consultative Conference